Patti Wuthrich (born July 17, 1958 in Winnipeg as Patti "Vande" Vandekerckhove) is a Canadian curler and curling coach from Gimli, Manitoba.

As a junior curler, she won the 1974 Canadian Junior Curling Championships playing second for the Chris Pidzarko rink. She won the  playing lead for Cathy Pidzarko.

She competed at the 1988 Winter Olympics when curling was a demonstration sport. The Canadian women's team won the gold medal, defeating Sweden in the final.

Patti Vandekerckhove was inducted into the Canadian Curling Hall of Fame in 1986.

After retirement she began coaching teams on the national and international level, for example the team of Kerri Einarson or the Korean team of Kim Eun-jung.

Personal life
She is married to well-known Canadian ice maker Hans Wuthrich. She is currently the owner of Minerva Tree Farms.

Teams

Record as a coach of national teams

Record as a coach of club teams

References

External links

Patti Wuthrich - Curling Canada Stats Archive
Video:
  (YouTube channel "Curling Canada") (Video interviews with Jennifer Jones, Patti Wuthrich, Jill Brothers and Jenn Hanna after Draw 10 at the 2016 Scotties Tournament of Hearts.)
  (YouTube channel "RT Sport"; November 8, 2010) (Curling is a fairly new sport for Russians but the country's sports bosses are keen for it to dominate at the next winter Games in Sochi. So, the National Olympic Committee has turned to Canada for help.) (with Patti Wuthrich, Hans Wuthrich, Jason Gunnlaugson and others)

Living people
1958 births
Curlers from Winnipeg
Canadian women curlers
Curlers at the 1988 Winter Olympics
Olympic curlers of Canada
Canadian women's curling champions
Canadian curling coaches
People from Gimli, Manitoba